Elbert B. Watson (1879-1963), commonly known as E.B. Watson, was an architect based in Norfolk, Nebraska.

Several of his works are listed on the U.S. National Register of Historic Places for their architecture.

He was born November 7, 1879 in Iowa City, Iowa. He studied at Iowa State University, in Ames, Iowa. He died February 19, 1963.

Works include:
Norfolk Municipal Airport Administration Building, Norfolk, Moderne style, NRHP-listed
Norfolk Municipal Auditorium (1939–40)
Koenigstein Block and Granada Theater (1927)
Three schools in the area of Norfolk
Athletic Park Band Shell in Plainview, Nebraska, NRHP-listed
Knox County Courthouse in Center, Nebraska, NRHP-listed
Rock County Courthouse in Bassett, Nebraska, NRHP-listed

The practice absorbed the business of Norfolk architect James C. Stitt.

References

External links
Elbert Benjamin Watson (1879-1963), Architect, at Nebraska Encyclopedia

1879 births
1963 deaths
20th-century American architects
Architects from Iowa
Architects from Nebraska
People from Iowa City, Iowa
People from Norfolk, Nebraska
Iowa State University alumni